Richard S. Young (died 1996) was an American biologist.

Life and career
Richard Young was born in Kings Park, New York. He attended Gettysburg College and Florida State University. 

Young started his career as a research scientist for the Food and Drug Administration.

During the 1960s and 1970s, Young was the head of life sciences exploration program of the U.S. In 1979, he became vice-president of the Rockefeller University.

Young died due to prostate cancer in 1996.

References

1996 deaths
American biologists
NASA people
Astrobiologists
Presidents of Rockefeller University
People from Kings Park, New York
Gettysburg College alumni
Florida State University alumni